is a city in Saitama Prefecture, Japan. , the city had an estimated population of 353,214 in 162,210 households and a population density of 3200 persons per km². The city is known locally as  after the old name for Tokyo, due to its many historic buildings.

Geography
Located in the Musashino Terrace of central Saitama Prefecture, both the Arakawa and the Iruma Rivers flow through the city, which is approximately 30 kilometers from downtown Tokyo. The city area is approximately 16.3 km east–west and approximately 13.8 km north–south. The altitude is 18.5 meters above sea level in Motomachi, the highest at the southern end of the city is 50.7 meters, the lowest in the eastern part is 6.9 meters.

Surrounding municipalities
Saitama Prefecture
 Ageo
 Saitama
 Sakado
 Tsurugashima
 Tokorozawa
 Hidaka
 Fujimi
 Fujimino
 Miyoshi
 Kawajima
 Sayama

Climate
Kawagoe has a humid subtropical climate (Köppen Cfa) characterized by warm summers and cool winters with light to no snowfall.  The average annual temperature in Kawagoe is 14.2 °C. The average annual rainfall is 1448 mm with September as the wettest month. The temperatures are highest on average in August, at around 26.0 °C, and lowest in January, at around 2.5 °C.

Demographics
Per Japanese census data, the population of Kawagoe has increased steadily over the past century.

History
Kawagoe is part of ancient Musashi Province and the area was heavily contested between the Later Hōjō clan and the two branches of the Uesugi clan, as they vied for control of the Kantō region. In the 1450s, Kawagoe was held by the Yamanouchi branch of the Uesugi Clan. Decades later, Hōjō Ujitsuna seized Kawagoe Castle in 1537, and the city served as an important base of operations when the Later Hōjō clan sought to gain control of the Kantō. For roughly two decades after that, the Uesugi launched a number of attempts to regain the region. This culminated in the 1545 Battle of Kawagoe, as the heavily outnumbered Hōjō garrison of Kawagoe defeated an attempted siege of Kawagoe Castle. This victory would lead to the end of Uesugi power in the region, and the near-total destruction of the clan. The Hōjō having secured themselves in the region, Kawagoe served for another forty-five years as a satellite castle town defending Edo, and the clan's central castle at Odawara. Kawagoe's location on the Arakawa River and near the Edo River were important elements of its tactical significance in defending the Kantō region from potential attacks from the north.

During the Edo period, Kawagoe Castle was the headquarters of the Kawagoe Domain under the Tokugawa shogunate, which had the largest kokudaka of any holding in the Kantō region outside of the control of the Tokugawa clan. The city prospered as a commercial and transshipment center and was nicknamed the "kitchen of Edo". After the Meiji restoration, it briefly became capital of Kawagoe Prefecture (1871) then Iruma Prefecture (1871–1873), before becoming part of Saitama Prefecture.

The town of Kawagoe was created within Iruma District, Saitama with the establishment of the modern municipalities system on April 1, 1889. A large part of the town was destroyed in a fire on May 13, 1893 and was rebuilt with many structures using construction techniques of traditional kura warehouses. On December 1, 1922 Kawagoe merged with neighboring Senba Village, and was elevated to city status, with a population of 30,359. It was the first municipality in Saitama Prefecture to receive city status. 

The village of Tanomozawa was annexed in 1939. The city escaped World War II with only minor damage. The city expanded in 1955 by annexing the villages of Yoshino, Furuya, Minamifuruya, Takashina, Fukuhara, Daito, Kasumigaseki, Naguwashi and Yamada. In December 1999, the old core of Kawagoe was designated a Historic Preservation District. On April 1, 2003, Kawagoe was designated a core city with increased local autonomy.

Government
Kawagoe has a mayor-council form of government with a directly elected mayor and a unicameral city council of 36 members. Kawagoe contributes four members to the Saitama Prefectural Assembly. In terms of national politics, the city is part of Saitama 7th district of the lower house of the Diet of Japan.

List of Kawagoe mayors (from 1922)

Education

Universities and colleges
Toyo University - Kawagoe campus
Tokyo International University
Toho College of Music
Shobi University
Saitama Medical University – Kawagoe campus

Primary and secondary education
Kawagoe has 32 public elementary schools and 22 public middle schools operated by the city government, and one private elementary school and four private combined middle/high schools. The city has seven public high schools operated by the Saitama Board of Education, one by the Kawagoe city government and three private high schools. The prefecture also operates three special education schools for the handicapped.

Transportation

Railway

 JR East – Kawagoe Line
 -  -  - 
 Tōbu Railway -  Tōbu Tōjō Line
  -  -  - 
 Seibu Railway - Seibu Shinjuku Line
  -

Highway

Cycling
The city of Kawagoe operates a bicycle sharing scheme in the city centre, with eight pickup/parking locations.

Twin towns and sister cities
Kawagoe is twinned with the following six municipalities in Japan and worldwide.

Japan
 Nakasatsunai, Hokkaido, since November 2002
 Obama, Fukui, since November 1982
 Tanagura, Fukushima, since January 1972

Worldwide
 Autun, France, since October 2002
 Offenbach am Main, Germany, since August 1983
  Salem, Oregon, United States, since August 1986
  Jacareí, São Paulo (state), Brazil, since August 1977

Local attractions

Kawagoe is famous for its sweet potatoes, and the local "Candy Street" sells such treats as sweet potato chips, sweet potato ice cream, sweet potato coffee, and even sweet potato beer, brewed at the local Coedo Brewery. Some of its streets preserve the old castle town of the Edo period (17th to 19th centuries).

Sights

The present structure goes back to 1894, a year after the Great Fire of Kawagoe. It is a three-story tower measuring 16 meters in height. The tower has been telling time to the city's residents for 350 years and has been deemed as a symbol of the city. Currently, the bell can be heard four times a day (6 AM, 12 PM, 3 PM and 6 PM) 
 is a small backstreet alley where a dozen stores sell old-fashioned cheap sweets and snacks, most of which are priced at less than 50 yen.  The location was known as a neighborhood where scores of confectionery manufactures lined the alley. Many tourists come here to enjoy the nostalgic atmosphere of the early Shōwa period. Meibutsu of Confectionary Row include fukashi, a stick of wheat bran covered in brown sugar, and amezaiku.
 is lined with traditional warehouses constructed in a style called  and maintains the style of the Edo period. The city of Kawagoe started building kurazukuri-style warehouses in the aftermath of a great fire that consumed one-third of the old Kawagoe in 1893. The style was designed to be fireproof. Within and beyond the Kurazukuri Street, many warehouses from the 18th and 19th centuries can still be seen. The Kawagoe Kurazukuri Museum is located in a traditional warehouse built in 1893 and allows its visitors to walk around inside and experience the life of Edo merchants. The artisan shops in the area include Machikan, a sword and knife manufacturer in operation for generations.

Festivals
Kawagoe Festival is held every year on the third Saturday and Sunday of October. In 2016, it was designated as an "Intangible cultural heritage".

Notable people from Kawagoe

Asada Nobuoki, General in the Imperial Japanese Army
Hisako Higuchi, professional golfer
Masachika Ichimura, actor
Nanaka Suwa, voice actress
Nobutaka Shiōden, General in the Imperial Japanese Army
Sho Tsuboi, racing driver

References

External links

Official Website 
Little Edo: The Ultimate guide to visiting the 400-year old district of Kawagoe 

 
Cities in Saitama Prefecture